Don Murdoch is an ice hockey player.

Don or Donald Murdoch may also refer to:

Donald Murdoch (cricketer)
Don Murdoch (rugby league)